Trinidad and Tobago competed at the 1992 Summer Olympics in Barcelona, Spain. Five track and field athletes and two cyclists represented Trinidad and Tobago. The team was headed by chef de mission Hasely Crawford, the winner of the gold medal in the 100 metres at the 1976 Summer Olympics.

Competitors
The following is the list of number of competitors in the Games.

Athletics

Men's 100m metres
Ato Boldon 
 Heat — 10.77 (→ did not advance)

Men's 4 × 400 m Relay
Alvin Daniel, Patrick Delice, Neil de Silva, and Ian Morris   
 Heat — 3:01.05
 Final — 3:03.31 (→ 7th place)

 Robert Guy

Cycling

Men's sprint
 Maxwell Cheeseman

Men's 1 km time trial
 Gene Samuel

Men's points race
 Gene Samuel

See also
Trinidad and Tobago at the 1991 Pan American Games

References

External links
Official Olympic Reports

Nations at the 1992 Summer Olympics
1992
Summer Olympics